Hypothermia is a 2012 American independent horror film written and directed by James Felix McKenney. It stars Michael Rooker, Blanche Baker, Greg Finley, Don Wood and Amy Chang. The film centers on a family out ice fishing only to discover that something deadly is stalking them from the icy waters.

Plot
On an icy lake, Ray Pelletier scouts out a good ice fishing spot for his family. He spots something bloody on the ice near a hole, walks toward it and falls through when the ice breaks. Back at the cabin, his wife Helen, son David and his son's girlfriend Gina are waiting for him. Ray has been struggling for hours to get out of the hole. Helen asks David and Gina what their plans are after college, and they mention that they will be joining the Peace Corps and going to Uganda following graduation.

Meanwhile, something in the water watches Ray as he struggles. He finally gets out of the water as his family goes out searching for him. The creature follows David as he walks on the ice. David finds Ray passed out from exhaustion. They return to the cabin, where Gina examines him. Ray assures everyone he is fine. The creature watches the family from a window.

The next day, the family drills through the ice as the creature watches from underneath. They wonder why it is taking so long for the first bite of the day. They see a truck arrive on the ice, towing a trailer. Steve Cote and his son Steven Jr. set up for ice fishing. Ray eventually gets annoyed at their loud music and asks the Cotes to turn it down, which they do. The Cotes then drive away in the truck, leaving their trailer.

Soon after, the Cotes return on snowmobiles, chasing the creature under the ice. The creature and the men head straight for the family. The creature snags all of their lines and their rods break. The Cotes are frustrated that they did not catch the creature. The two groups socialize and the men offer to fish with them, but the Pelletiers decline. Steve then shows the family their trailer. While walking back to their fishing hole, the family spots the creature heading straight for the men. Steven Jr. attempts to reel it in, but it pulls him down. Steve grabs his ankles, and Ray grabs Steve and they all pull Steven Jr. up. They notice that he has a huge gash on his arm. Steve takes him inside for "a hot shower and a cold beer".

The Cotes discuss the creature. They believe it can sense vibrations and is eating everything in the lake. Steve invites the Pelletier family to dinner and they reluctantly accept, since they have nothing, having planned to eat whatever they had caught. During dinner, Steven Jr. begins to feel disoriented, and his wound squirts blood onto Gina. They examine the wound, which looks infected. Gina wraps it up. Steven Jr. insists the creature is not a fish because it had legs. The family urges Steve to take him to the hospital, but Steve angrily refuses, implying his son is too tough to need a doctor.

Later that night, Ray, Steve and David are out on the ice, running a motor to disorient the creature's senses. Steven Jr. comes out from the trailer and collapses as soon as the others see him. They hear a noise and the creature attacks, grabbing Steven Jr. and pulling him into the water. Steve jumps in after him, but sees that his son is dead. Ray jumps in and retrieves Steve.

When Steve wakes up, they decide to leave as soon as he is ready. They also tell Steve that he was cut by the creature. When Steve tries to get up, his cut oozes as if infected. Gina doesn't understand why, as she had treated it with disinfectant. Steve yells about wanting to hunt down the creature that killed his son. The family calms him down and they agree to leave in the morning.

As they rest, Ray hears Steve starting the snowmobiles to attract the creature. As Steve argues with Ray, he begins to experience the same disorientation that his son felt earlier. The creature attacks after David comes out to see what is going on, and takes Steve with it. When it returns, David and Ray get into the trailer, but David now has a cut on his face. Helen panics and sucks out the venom. They stay in the trailer to hide from the creature. They decide to wait for an opportunity to leave. As David lies on the floor, the creature's hand pushes through the lid in the floor and claws at David, cutting his throat and killing him.

In the morning, Gina reveals she and David had planned to get married before going into the Peace Corps, and that they were going to announce it last night at dinner, but never got a chance with all that happened. Ray grabs one of Steve's guns and the family goes outside. Gina views Steve's remains with horror. Ray attempts to attract the creature by starting the snowmobiles, but they will not start. They walk toward the cabin carefully. They hear a sound, and look back to see that Steve's body is gone. The creature is eating the body under the water. As they continue walking, they see the shadow of the creature swimming under the ice beneath them. Ray urges Helen and Gina to get to the shore while he fights the creature off. The creature rams the ice under Ray so that it cracks and breaks under his weight. Ray is killed. The creature stalks Helen and Gina. When it catches them, it stares them down as Helen talks to it. It leaves them and the women calmly walk toward the cabin.

Cast
 Michael Rooker as Ray Pelletier
 Blanche Baker as Helen Pelletier
 Benjamin Hugh Abel Forster as David Pelletier
 Amy Chang as Gina  
 Don Wood as Steve Cote
 Greg Finley as Steven Cote Jr.
 Larry Fessenden as Fishing Host
 Asa Liebmann as Lake Man

Production

Hypothermia was shot in Mayfield, New York at Great Sacandaga Lake, finishing in March 2010.

Release
The film was released on DVD by Dark Sky Films on October 2, 2012.

Reception

Hypothermia received mostly negative review upon its release.
Dread Central awarded the film a score of 2.5 out of 5, criticizing the film's minimal plot, character development, editing, and monster costume, which they called "laughably cheap". The review did, however write, "That said, there’s still enjoyment to be derived from both the competently made and laughably bad sides of Hypothermia. An ungainly mix, to be certain, but one I can semi-recommend to fans of old fashioned monster movies." Rob Getz from HorrorNews.net stated that the film started out strong, with good cinematography, building of tension, and establishment of its sparse characters. However, Getz further stated that the film was ruined by the "cheesy" monster costume, and anticlimactic finale, calling it "a shameful waste of potential". Felix Vasquez of Cinema Crazed similarly criticized the film's monster design, and finale, while also criticizing the film's off kilter tone and writing. Vasquez concluded his review by writing, "I wish I could recommend this and boast about it being a hidden gem, but in the end it’s merely forgettable and only worth trying for the sake of Rooker."  Ian Jane from DVD Talk gave the film 2.5 out of 5 stars, writing, "Hypothermia features a decent performance from a top billed Michael Rooker and has the potential to be a fun little monster movie but never quite lives up to its potential." 
Jason Coffman from Film Monthly called it "a lean, suspenseful horror show", while noting the low-budget monster design, he commended the film's acting, natural chemistry between characters, and convincing gore effects.

References

External links
 
 
 
 

2012 films
2012 horror films
2010s monster movies
American independent films
American natural horror films
American monster movies
Films shot in New York (state)
Glass Eye Pix films
2010s English-language films
2010s American films